The Symphony No. 5 in B major, K. 22, was composed by Wolfgang Amadeus Mozart in The Hague in December 1765, at the age of nine, while he was on his musical tour of Western Europe. Mozart fell seriously ill during his stay in The Hague, and he wrote this composition probably while he was convalescing from his illness.

Structure 
The symphony is scored for two oboes, two horns and strings.

The form is that of a three-movement Italian overture:
Allegro, 
Andante, 
Allegro molto, 

All three movements are coloured especially prominently by horns. A rousing first movement in the key of B major opens the symphony, followed by a more solemn, mournful movement in the relative key of G minor. A short, boisterous finale closes the work. The opening theme to the finale is borrowed from the finale to keyboard concerto by Johann Christian Bach whom Mozart had met the previous year in London. The same theme would also appear in a much later, more mature work of Mozart's: the act 2 finale of his 1786 opera buffa, Le nozze di Figaro, K. 492.

References

External links 

05
1765 compositions
Compositions in B-flat major